Follow the Fox is a Canadian short drama film, directed by Simon Laganière and released in 2014. The film stars Mathieu Gosselin and Francis La Haye as Richard and Clément, two brothers planning a bicycle ride across Canada to raise money after their grandfather is diagnosed with cancer.

The film was a Canadian Screen Award nominee for Best Live Action Short Drama at the 3rd Canadian Screen Awards, and a Prix Jutra nominee for Best Short Film at the 17th Jutra Awards.

References

External links
 

2014 short films
2014 films
Quebec films
2014 drama films
2010s French-language films
French-language Canadian films
Canadian drama short films
2010s Canadian films